is a Japanese former judoka. He competed in the men's lightweight event at the 1976 Summer Olympics. He was World Champion in 1973 and 1975, and Asia Champion in 1974.

References

External links
 

1951 births
Living people
Japanese male judoka
Olympic judoka of Japan
Judoka at the 1976 Summer Olympics
Sportspeople from Hiroshima
20th-century Japanese people
21st-century Japanese people